It Hurts to Be in Love is the fourth studio album from American singer and songwriter Dan Hartman, released by Blue Sky in 1981. It was produced by Hartman and mixed by Neil Dorfsman.

Background
After the success of Hartman's two disco-oriented albums Instant Replay (1978) and Relight My Fire (1979), Hartman changed musical direction with It Hurts to Be in Love. Returning to the sound of his 1976 album Images, the album moved away from disco to a more melodic pop-rock sound. The album was recorded at the Schoolhouse (Hartman's own home studio in Connecticut), mixed at Power Station and mastered at Sterling Sound.

It Hurts to Be in Love failed to make a chart appearance in the US, although the three singles from it saw some chart action. The first, "Heaven in Your Arms", reached No. 86 on the Billboard Hot 100. "It Hurts to Be in Love", a cover of the 1964 hit by Gene Pitney, was the second single, which peaked at No. 72 on the Billboard Hot 100, and No. 48 on the Dance Music/Club Play chart. The third and final single, "All I Need", reached No. 10 on the Bubbling Under the Hot 100 chart. It also peaked at No. 41 on the Billboard Hot Adult Contemporary Tracks chart.

In a Blue Sky press release, Hartman spoke of the album: "I felt it was time to do the things that were truly me. This music is closer to me because it has more romantic sensitivity than I've allowed myself to show in past productions. I'm really pouring it all out. I guess you could say there's more Dan Hartman in there than any other record I've done. My music is spontaneous and provides an outlet for emotional release and expression, while my studio allows me to write, arrange and record my own songs within that same space. The result is music that comes straight from my heart - I can capture more feeling that way."

Reception

Upon release, Billboard commented: "Hartman returns to his roots here; that is to the music of the mid '60s. Then he updates the sound to the '80s, creating a classy pop package. It is mid-tempo pop-rock mostly, with virtually every cut sounding like an adult contemporary single. Especially impressive here is Hartman's stylish vocalizing." People wrote: "This effort shows an eclectic taste that ranges from sensitive, James Taylorish ballads to rhythmic rockers. His rendition of the frothy pop title tune does little to improve on the 1964 original, though. Sensitive singers, the genre in which Hartman belongs, are abundant, but his agility is refreshing."

Track listing

Chart performance

Singles
It Hurts to Be in Love

Heaven in Your Arms

All I Need

Personnel
 Dan Hartman - vocals, keyboards, all instruments except drums and synthesizer on "Heaven in Your Arms" and "Positive Forces"
 Erik Cartwright - guitar
 Jeff Bova - synthesizer
 John Pierce - bass
 Art Wood - drums
 Blanche Napoleon - backing vocals on "It Hurts to Be in Love"

Production
 Dan Hartman - producer, recording
 Neil Dorfsman - mixing
 Barry Bongiovi, Dave Greenberg, James Farber, Ray Willhard - assistant engineers
 Jeff Jones - recording
 Ted Jensen - mastering

Other
 Carin Goldberg - design
 Jerry King Musser - photography
 Steve Paul, Teddy Slatus - management, coordinators

References

1981 albums
Dan Hartman albums
Albums produced by Dan Hartman
Blue Sky Records albums